Zhongchuan Airport railway station or Zhongchuanjichang railway station is a railway station located in Yongdeng County on the Lanzhou–Zhongchuan Airport Intercity Railway, which served as Airport rail link system for the Lanzhou Zhongchuan International Airport.

The station is close to the airport terminal. It takes about 30 minutes from the Lanzhou West railway station to the Airport. The station is opened on 30 September 2015, along with the railway.

Sources

External links 

 Zhongchuan Airport Station , by Etrip China

Railway stations in Gansu
Railway stations in China opened in 2015
Airport railway stations in China